Sai Kung & Clearwater Bay Magazine is a free-distributed English-language lifestyle magazine published in Hong Kong by Hong Kong Living Ltd. (formerly Fast Media Ltd). Premiering in 2009, the magazine targets highly-affluent professionals who work in Hong Kong but raise their families in the more spacious coastal suburbs the territory. It offers living advice, parenting and education advice, property news as well as exploring outdoor activities and local entertainment listings. It is also well known for its aerial photos. New issues are distributed on the first day of each month. It has a claimed readership of 31,000.

History
Sai Kung & Clearwater Bay Magazine was founded by Tom Hilditch. The first issue was called simply Sai Kung Magazine, and was published in October 2009 by local private company, Hong Kong Living Ltd. It had 36 pages. In January 2010 the title was changed to "Sai Kung & Clearwater Bay Magazine". In June 2010 the magazine had 60 pages. In 2019, the magazine celebrated 10 years of business.

Distribution
Sai Kung & Clearwater Bay Magazine is distributed free at around 100 venues including restaurants, bars, coffee shops, bookshops, country clubs, private residential complexes and international schools. Piles of Sai Kung Magazine displayed in acrylic stands are a common sight in Sai Kung bars, restaurants and country clubs in the early days of each month.

Readership
The magazine prints 10,000 copies per month and claims around 31,000 readers per month.

According to a survey conducted by Sai Kung & Clearwater Bay Magazine in 2010, 88% of the readers are holders of at least one university degree and 80% earn more than HK$100,000 per month. 78% have children of school age. (Source: Sai Kung & Clearwater Bay Readership Survey).

Contents
Sai Kung Magazine usually contains lifestyle features about local events, dining, property, boating, hiking, parenting and local environment issues.--> The main sections that appear regularly in the magazine are:
LettersLetters from readers. There may be comments or thoughts about past issues of the magazine or opinions towards social issue, etc.
PlannerListings of local events and happenings.
NewsReports of local interest and community news.
Local HeroAn interview section that features celebrated residents. Past interviewees have included Sir David Tang, Jill Robinson, Kenneth Bi and Wayne Parfitt
DiningThis section includes features and reviews on restaurants and cafes, introducing the latest news on where to find delicacies in Sai Kung & Clearwater Bay. There are usually recommendations of an indoor, an outdoor and a new restaurant in every issue. Sometimes, there will be a collection of recommendations from a particular area or cuisine.
PropertyUsually the story of an upscale family house that has been redesigned or renovated.
SchoolsA look at some local or international school or after-school activity.
Family Columns and advice about coping with children and parenting.
Health & BeautyNews, features and reviews of local spas and health studios.
PetsA column by Dr Pauline, a well known local vet.
Zim CityA column by Paul Zimmerman exploring ideas for better community living Hong Kong.
Gardening A column by Jane Ram, which the magazine claims is "the only gardening column in Hong Kong", a city otherwise dominated by skyscrapers.
MarketplaceAn advertising section with no editorial except for an extensive local "Directory of Shops & Services".
The Back PageA monthly column written by former Observer Asia Correspondent and veteran Sai Kung resident Stephen Vines.

Publisher
Sai Kung & Clearwater Bay Magazine is a publication of Hong Kong Living Limited.

See also
Media in Hong Kong

References

Companies Registry (2005). Retrieved 11 October 2005.

External links
Sai Kung & Clearwater Bay Magazine website

English-language magazines
Free magazines
Magazines published in Hong Kong
Lifestyle magazines
Magazines established in 2009
Monthly magazines